Vezmestan may refer to:
 Vezmestan, Lorestan
 Vezmestan, Markazi